The Syracuse All-Americans were an American basketball team based in Syracuse, New York that was a member of the American Basketball League.

In their only season, the team dropped out of the league during the first half on January 6, 1930, and forfeited their final four games.

Year-by-year

All-Americans
Basketball teams in New York (state)